Mohsen Arzani (born September 23, 1984) is an Iranian football player currently playing in the Iran's Premier Football League.
Arzani played for Iran at the 2001 FIFA U-17 World Championship in Trinidad and Tobago. He was a member of Iran national under-23 football team, participating in the 2006 Asian Games in Qatar.

References

1984 births
Persian Gulf Pro League players
Saipa F.C. players
Paykan F.C. players
Esteghlal Ahvaz players
Payam Mashhad players
Iranian footballers
Living people
Asian Games bronze medalists for Iran
Asian Games medalists in football
Footballers at the 2006 Asian Games
Medalists at the 2006 Asian Games
Association football defenders